KKJM "Spirit 92.9" is a radio station in St. Cloud, Minnesota airing a contemporary Christian music format. The station is owned by Gabriel Communications. Its main competitors are KCFB, Air 1 on 89.5 FM, and KTIS-FM in Minneapolis, Minnesota.

External links

Radio stations in St. Cloud, Minnesota
Contemporary Christian radio stations in the United States
Radio stations established in 1996
1996 establishments in Minnesota
Christian radio stations in Minnesota